Trichonyssodrys is a genus of beetles in the family Cerambycidae, containing the following species:

 Trichonyssodrys aureopilosus Monné, 1990
 Trichonyssodrys cinctus Delfino, 1981
 Trichonyssodrys maculatus Gilmour, 1957
 Trichonyssodrys melasmus Delfino, 1981

References

Acanthocinini